Afro-Caribbean people or African Caribbean are Caribbean people who trace their full or partial ancestry to sub-Saharan Africa. The majority of the modern African-Caribbeans descend from Africans taken as slaves to colonial Caribbean via the trans-Atlantic slave trade between the 15th and 19th centuries to work primarily on various sugar plantations and in domestic households. Other names for the ethnic group include Black Caribbean, Afro or Black West Indian or Afro or Black Antillean. The term Afro-Caribbean was not coined by Caribbean people themselves but was first used by European Americans in the late 1960s.

People of Afro-Caribbean descent today are largely of West African ancestry, and may additionally be of other origins, including European, South Asian and native Caribbean descent, as there has been extensive intermarriage and unions among the peoples of the Caribbean over the centuries.

Although most Afro-Caribbean people today continue to live in English, French and Spanish-speaking Caribbean nations and territories, there are also significant diaspora populations throughout the Western world, especially in the United States, Canada, United Kingdom, France and the Netherlands. Caribbean peoples are predominantly of Christian faith, though some practice African-derived or syncretic religions, such as Santeria or Vodou. Many speak creole languages, such as Haitian Creole, Jamaican Patois, or Papiamento.

Both the home and diaspora populations have produced a number of individuals who have had a notable influence on modern African, Caribbean and Western societies; they include political activists such as Marcus Garvey and C. L. R. James; writers and theorists such as Aimé Césaire and Frantz Fanon; US military leader and statesman Colin Powell; and musicians Bob Marley, Nicki Minaj and Rihanna.

History

16th–18th centuries
During the post-Columbian era, the archipelagos and islands of the Caribbean were the first sites of African diaspora dispersal in the western Atlantic. Specifically, in 1492, Pedro Alonso Niño, an African-Spanish seafarer, was recorded as piloting one of Columbus' ships. He returned in 1499, but did not settle. In the early 16th century, more Africans began to enter the population of the Spanish Caribbean colonies, sometimes arriving as free men of mixed ancestry or as indentured servants, but increasingly as enslaved workers and servants. This increasing demand for African labour in the Caribbean was in part the result of massive depopulation of the native Taino and other indigenous peoples caused by the new infectious diseases, harsh conditions, and warfare brought by European colonists. By the mid-16th century, the slave trade from West Africa to the Caribbean was so profitable that Francis Drake and John Hawkins were prepared to engage in piracy as well as break Spanish colonial laws, in order to forcibly transport approximately 1500 enslaved people from Sierra Leone to Hispaniola (modern-day Haiti and the Dominican Republic).

During the 17th and 18th centuries, European colonial development in the Caribbean became increasingly reliant on plantation slavery to cultivate and process the lucrative commodity crop of sugarcane. On many islands shortly before the end of the 18th century, the enslaved Afro-Caribbeans greatly outnumbered their European masters. In addition, there developed a class of free people of color, especially in the French islands, where persons of mixed race were given certain rights. On Saint-Domingue, free people of color and slaves rebelled against harsh conditions, and constant inter-imperial warfare. Inspired by French revolutionary sentiments that at one point freed the slaves, Toussaint L'Ouverture and Jean Jacques Dessalines led the Haitian Revolution that gained the independence of Haiti in 1804, the first Afro-Caribbean republic in the Western Hemisphere.

19th–20th centuries
In 1804, Haiti, with its overwhelmingly African population and leadership, became the second nation in the Americas to win independence from a European state. During the 19th century, continuous waves of rebellion, such as the Baptist War, led by Sam Sharpe in Jamaica, created the conditions for the incremental abolition of slavery in the region by various colonial powers. Great Britain abolished slavery in its holdings in 1834. Cuba was the last island to be emancipated, when Spain abolished slavery in its colonies.

During the 20th century, Afro-Caribbean people, who were a majority in many Caribbean societies, began to assert their cultural, economic, and political rights with more vigor on the world stage. Marcus Garvey was among many influential immigrants to the United States from Jamaica, expanding his UNIA movement in New York City and the U.S.  Afro-Caribbeans were influential in the Harlem Renaissance as artists and writers. Aimé Césaire developed a négritude movement.

In the 1960s, the West Indian territories were given their political independence from British colonial rule. They were pre-eminent in creating new cultural forms such as reggae music, calypso and Rastafari within the Caribbean. Beyond the region, a developing Afro-Caribbean diaspora in the United States, including such figures as Stokely Carmichael and DJ Kool Herc, was influential in the development of the Black Power movement of the 1960s and the hip-hop movement of the 1980s. African-Caribbean individuals also contributed to cultural developments in Europe, as evidenced by influential theorists such as Frantz Fanon and Stuart Hall.

Notable people

Politics
Sir Grantley Adams – Barbados, politician and lawyer; the first and only Prime Minister of the West Indies Federation (1958–1962)
Jean-Bertrand Aristide – politician, priest and head of state, Haiti
Dean Barrow – head of government, Belize
Maurice Bishop – Grenada, revolutionary leader
Paul Bogle – Jamaica, political activist
Ertha Pascal Trouillot – Haiti, first Black female president in the world, lawyer
Juan Almeida Bosque – Cuban revolutionary and politician
Dutty Boukman – Haitian freedom fighter
Forbes Burnham – Guyana, head of government
Bussa – Barbados, freedom fighter
Stokely Carmichael – Trinidad-born, civil rights activist and leader in the US
Mary Eugenia Charles – Dominican head of government
Perry Christie – Bahamian, politician and lawyer
Henri Christophe – Haiti, revolutionary, general and head of state
David Clarke(sheriff)- Barbudan, Former Sheriff of Milwaukee
John Compton – Saint Lucia, politician and lawyer
Francisco del Rosario Sánchez, Dominican Republic founding father, revolutionary, and president
Paris Dennard-Grenada, former CNN political commentator
Jean-Jacques Dessalines – Haiti (est. 1804), revolutionary, general and first head of state of independent Haiti
Papa Doc Duvalier – dictator of Haiti, 20th century
Marcus Garvey – Jamaica, politician and writer, founder of UNIA and active in US politics from 1916–1927
Philip Goldson – Belize, politician
Ulises Heureaux - Dominican Republic president and military leader
Sam Hinds – Guyana, head of government
Hubert Ingraham – Bahamian, politician and lawyer
Toussaint L'Ouverture – Saint-Domingue, revolutionary, general and governor
Joseph Robert Love – Bahamian-born, medical doctor; Jamaican politician and political activist who influenced Marcus Garvey
Gregorio Luperón - Dominican Republic revolutionary, general and president
Antonio Maceo Grajales – Cuban revolutionary and general
Michael Manley – Jamaica, politician
Jon Miller-Montserrat, Conservative Review, BlazeTV Host
Nanny of the Maroons – Jamaica, freedom fighter
Jeanne Odo - Haiti, abolitionist
Candace Owens-British Virgin Islander, PragerU Radio and Founder of Blexit
Lynden Pindling – Bahamian politician, and first Prime minister of the Bahamas
Samuel Jackman Prescod – Barbados, first elected Afro-Caribbean politician in the House of Assembly
Sam Sharpe – Jamaica, freedom fighter
Solitude – Guadeloupe, freedom fighter
Eric Eustace Williams – Trinidad and Tobago politician, writer and head of government
Colin Powell – Jamaican descent, US Army General, Chairman Joint Chiefs of Staff
Kamala Devi Harris – Jamaican descent, first African American, first Asian American, and First Female Vice President of the United States

Science and philosophy
Frantz Fanon – Martinique, writer, psychiatrist and freedom fighter
Hubert Harrison – St. Croix, writer, orator, educator, critic, and race and class conscious political activist based in Harlem, New York
Stuart Hall – Jamaican philosopher
C. L. R. James – Trinidad and Tobago, activist and writer
W. Arthur Lewis – Saint Lucia, economist and Nobel Prize recipient
Pedro Alonso Niño – Afro-Spanish explorer
Arlie Petters – Belizean mathematician
Walter Rodney – Guyanese activist and writer
Mary Seacole – Jamaican nurse and hospital director

Arts and culture
Carlos Acosta – Cuba, ballet dancer
Beenie Man – Jamaica, artist and musician
Frank Bowling – Guyana, painter
Esther Rolle - Actress of Bahamian descent
Aimé Césaire – Martinique, fiction writer
Celia Cruz – Cuba, singer
Stacey Dash – Barbadian descent, actress
Bert Williams - Bahamian entertainer, and probably the first successful Afro-Caribbean entertainer in America
AngelaMaria Davila- Puerto Rican poet 
Eddy Grant – Guyana, singer and musician
Edward W. Hardy – Puerto Rican, composer and musician
C. L. R. James – Trinidad, historian, essayist and journalist
Wyclef Jean – Haitian singer, composer and activist
Earl Lovelace – Trinidad, novelist and writer
Luis Palés Matos - Puerto Rican poet 
Bob Marley – Jamaica, singer and musician
Ziggy Marley (Bob Marley’s son) - Jamaica, singer and musician                                                                                                                                                              
Myke Towers – Puerto Rican, rapper
The Mighty Sparrow – Grenadian/Trinidadian singer and composer
Trinidad James - Trinidad, rapper 
Zoe Saldana – American actress of Dominican and Puerto Rican descent 
Nicki Minaj – Trinidad, rapper and singer
Sean Paul  – Jamaica, dancehall artist
Shyne -Belize rapper 
Sidney Poitier – Bahamas, first actor of African American or Afro-Caribbean descent to win an Academy Award-winning in the USA
Rihanna – Barbados, singer
Chevalier de Saint-Georges – Guadeloupe, composer
Antony Santos - Dominican Repulic, bachata singer
Peter Tosh – Jamaica, singer and musician
Bebo Valdés – Cuban musician
Johnny Ventura - Dominican Republic salsa and merengue singer
Corinne Bailey Rae - singer of Kittian descent
Derek Walcott – Saint Lucia, poet, recipient of the Nobel Prize for Literature
Pop Smoke - American rapper of Jamaican and Panamanian descent

Sports
Kirani James - Grenada, Grenada's first Olympic Gold Medalist and World's Fastest 400m runner from 2012 to 2016
Omar Amir-Bahamas, professional wrestler in the Ohio Valley Wrestling Arena
Deandre Ayton – Bahamas, #1 Overall Pick of the 2018 NBA Draft and player for the Phoenix Suns
Ozzie Albies – Curaçao, MLB player for the Atlanta Braves
John Barnes – Jamaican-born English footballer
Usain Bolt – Jamaica, Olympics gold medalist and the fastest man in history
Robinson Canó - Dominican Republic MLB player
Kingsley Coman – Guadeloupe, football player
Carmelo Anthony – Puerto Rican-American, Basketball Player
Tonique Williams-Darling - Bahamas, 400m runner and Olympic gold medalist
Tim Duncan – St. Croix (Anguilla parentage), basketball player
Shelly-Ann Fraser-Pryce – Jamaica, athlete
Thierry Henry – Guadeloupe, football player, best French scorer
Buddy Hield – Bahamas, NBA player for the Sacramento Kings
Kenley Jansen – Curaçao, MLB player for the Los Angeles Dodgers
Brian Lara – Trinidad, cricketer
Anthony Martial – Guadeloupe, French football player
Shaunae Miller – Bahamian, 400m and 200m runner and Olympic gold medalist
David Ortiz - Dominican Republic MLB player
Burgess Owens – Barbadian-born, former American football player
Sir Vivian Richards – Antigua, cricketer
Teddy Riner – Guadeloupe, Judoka
Errol Spence Jr. - Jamaican American, Boxer, current Unified Welterweight Champion.
Mike McCallum – Jamaica, Boxer, World Champion in 3 different weight classes.
Julian Jackson (boxer) - Saint Thomas, Boxer, 3-time world champion in 2 weight classes 
Darren Sammy – Saint Lucia, cricketer
Kimbo Slice – Bahamian boxer and MMA fighter
Sir Garfield Sobers – Barbados, cricketer
Sammy Sosa - Dominican Republic MLB player 
Karl-Anthony Towns – Dominican Republic-descended NBA player, #1 overall pick in the 2015 NBA Draft, NBA player for the Minnesota Timberwolves
Marcellus Wiley - Martinican American, former American football player and FOX Sports commentator/host
Adam Sanford – Dominican cricketer
Jayde Riviere – Dominican, Football Player
 Jay Emmanuel-Thomas - Dominican, Football player
 Konrad de la Fuente- Dominican-Americans football player
 Vurnon Anita - Curaçao Football player
 Joe Willock - Jamaican football player
 Fabrice Noel - Haitian footballer
  Jaron Vicario - Curaçaoan Football player
 Sanchez Watt - Jamaican football player

Main groups
Afro-Antiguan and Barbudan
Afro-Bahamian
Afro-Barbadian
Afro-Bermudian
Afro-Curaçaoans
Afro-Colombians
Afro-Costa Ricans
Afro-Cuban
Afro-Dominican (Dominica)
Afro-Dominican (Dominican Republic)
Afro-Grenadian
Afro-Guatemalan
Afro-Guyanese
Afro-Haitians
Afro-Hondurans
Afro-Jamaican
Afro-Kittian and Nevisian
Afro-Mexicans
Afro-Nicaraguan
Afro-Panamanian
Afro-Puerto Ricans
Afro-Saint Lucian
Afro-Salvadoran
Afro-Surinamese
Afro-Trinidadians and Tobagonians
Afro-Venezuelan
Afro-Vincentian
Belizean Creole people
Other members of the African diaspora in or from the Caribbean

Culture

Afro-Caribbean music

See also
 Afro-Latin Americans
 African diaspora in the Americas

References

External links

 
 
Ethnic groups in the Caribbean
Caribbean